Ferdinand Anton Nicolaus Teutenberg (4 December 1840 – 2 October 1933) was a New Zealand stonemason, carver, engraver, medallist and jeweller. He was born in Hüsten, Germany, in 1840.

References

1840 births
1933 deaths
New Zealand jewellers
German emigrants to New Zealand